Homalodisca is a genus of sharpshooters in the family Cicadellidae and tribe Proconiini. It contains a significant pest species, the Glassy-winged sharpshooter.

Species
The Catalogue of Life lists:
 Homalodisca admittens
 Homalodisca apicalis
 Homalodisca cornuta
 Homalodisca elongata
 Homalodisca excludens
 Homalodisca hambletoni
 Homalodisca ichthyocephala
 Homalodisca ignorata
 Homalodisca ignota
 Homalodisca indefensa
 Homalodisca insolita
 Homalodisca liturata
 Homalodisca lucernaria
 Homalodisca nitida
 Homalodisca noressa
 Homalodisca robusta
 Homalodisca spottii
 Homalodisca vitripennis

Gallery

References

External links 
 
 

Proconiini
Auchenorrhyncha genera